Magazine Appollodor is a magazine published in Syria and the magazine was launched in 2007. Its editor is Assif Shahin and assistant editor is Fadi Shahin.

Appollodor magazine covers architecture, art and decoration.

External links
 Official website

2007 establishments in Syria
Visual arts magazines
Magazines established in 2007
Magazines published in Syria